Grand Duchess Natalya Alexeyevna of Russia (21 July 1714 – 22 November 1728) was a Grand Duchess of Russia. She was the elder sister of Emperor Peter II of Russia.

Life
Natalya Alexeyvna was born in Saint Petersburg on 21 July 1714 as the daughter of Alexei Petrovich, Tsarevich of Russia and his wife, Charlotte Christine of Brunswick-Wolfenbüttel. After the death of her father, she and her brother were moved to the Russian royal court in 1719, where they were raised under the supervision of Anna Ivanovna Kramer.

Her brother became monarch in 1727, and Natalya thus became an heir to the throne after her aunts Elizabeth and Anna. She became a center of attention, and Menshikov wished to have her married to his son. Natalya was described as intelligent and kind, and was considered a good influence on her brother, whom was very close to her.

She died in Moscow—aged 14—due to tuberculosis, unmarried and without issue.

Ancestors

References

1714 births
1728 deaths
House of Romanov
Russian grand duchesses
Royalty from Saint Petersburg
18th-century women from the Russian Empire
Tuberculosis deaths in Russia
18th-century deaths from tuberculosis
Royalty and nobility who died as children